Meruana is a genus of African grasshoppers in the family Acrididae, subfamily Hemiacridinae from eastern Africa.

Species
, the Catalogue of Life and Orthoptera Species File list:
Meruana sakuensis (Kevan, 1966)
Meruana usambarica (Karsch, 1896) - type species (as Meruana nyuki Sjöstedt)

References 

Acrididae
Acrididae genera
Orthoptera of Africa